Jesse Braga is an American soccer player.  He played for Ponta Delgada S.C. of Fall River, Massachusetts which won the both 1947 National Challenge Cup and 1947 National Amateur Cup.  Based on these result, the U.S. Soccer Federation selected the club to act as the U.S. national team at the 1947 NAFC Championship.  As a result, Braga earned two caps with the U.S. national team.  In the first game, the U.S. lost 5-0 to Mexico and in the second, they lost 5-2 to Cuba.

References

External links
 
 

American soccer players
United States men's international soccer players
Ponta Delgada S.C. players
Soccer players from Massachusetts
Living people
Association football midfielders
Year of birth missing (living people)